The Australian Champion Middle  Distance Racehorse is awarded annually to the horse whose performances in Australia over distances between 1,401 m and 2,199 m are deemed to be the superior to its rivals.
It has been awarded since the 1999 - 2000 season.

Other Australian Thoroughbred Awards
Australian Champion Racehorse of the Year
Australian Champion Two Year Old
Australian Champion Three Year Old
Australian Champion Sprinter
Australian Champion Stayer
Australian Champion Filly or Mare
Australian Champion International Performer
Australian Champion Jumper
Australian Champion Trainer

References

Australian Thoroughbred racing awards